Eric in 2011 he enrolled to a competition, but was suspended due to continuing health issues.

References

Living people
American wrestlers
Year of birth missing (living people)